Henryk Łapiński (2 January 1933 – 11 September 2020) was a Polish film, theatre, and dubbing actor.

Łapiński was born in Warsaw. In 1956, he graduated from National Film School in Łódź.

Łapiński died in Warsaw on 11 September 2020, aged 87.

References

1933 births
Male actors from Warsaw
2020 deaths